Rosamond is a feminine given name, which may refer to:

People
Rosamond Carr (1912–2006), American humanitarian and author
Rosamund Clifford (before 1150 – c. 1176), English mistress of King Henry II
Rosamond Langbridge (1880–1964), Irish novelist, playwright and poet
Rosamond Lehmann (1901–1990), British novelist
Rosamond Marshall (1902–1957), American novelist
Rosamond McKitterick (born 1949), British medieval historian
R. J. Mitchell (author) (born 1902), English author and archivist
Rosamond Pinchot (1904–1938), American socialite and actress
Rosamond Praeger (1867–1954), Irish artist, sculptor and writer
Rosamond Royal, pen name of Jeanne Hines (born 1922), American writer
Rosamond Smith, a pen name of Joyce Carol Oates (born 1938), American author
Rose Wilkinson (1885–1968), Canadian politician
Rosamond "Roz" Young (1912 - 2005), American author, educator and historian

Fictional characters
the title character of The Complaint of Rosamond, by Samuel Daniel
a girl with four cats in the Nate the Great detective story series

See also
Rosamonde, Christian name of Soong Ching-ling (1893–1981), second wife of Sun Yat-sen
J. Rosamond Johnson (1873–1954), Bahamian-American male composer and singer
Babette Rosmond (1917–1997), American author
Rosamund

Feminine given names